Edward Augustus "Ansell" Clarke (12 August 1907 – 15 October 2002) was an Australian rules footballer in the Victorian Football League.

Football
Clarke made his debut for the Carlton Football Club in Round 7 of the 1929 season. He was appointed captain in 1937.

He was the senior coach at the St Kilda Football Club from 1938 to 1940 with 28 wins from 55 matches.  He was captain-coach for 1938 and 1939, until he retired as a player in May 1940.

He later returned as a player for one final match in July 1940.

Notes

External links

 
 
 Ansell Clarke at Blueseum

1907 births
2002 deaths
Australian rules footballers from Victoria (Australia)
Australian Rules footballers: place kick exponents
Carlton Football Club players
St Kilda Football Club players
St Kilda Football Club coaches
John Nicholls Medal winners